KFLD (870 AM) is a radio station broadcasting a News Talk Information format. Licensed to Pasco, Washington, United States, the station serves the Tri-Cities area. The station is currently owned by Townsquare Media and features programming from Fox News Radio, Compass Media Networks, Salem Radio Network, and Westwood One.
870 AM is a United States clear-channel frequency, on which WWL in New Orleans, Louisiana is the dominant Class A station.  All other stations, besides WWL, must either reduce power or leave the air during the period from sunset to sunrise in order to protect the nighttime skywave signal of WWL.

References

External links
Official Website

Online Streaming of the Tri-City Americans

FLD
Townsquare Media radio stations